The 101st Jäger Division was a light infantry Division of the German Army in World War II. It was formed in July 1942 by the redesignation of the 101st Light Infantry Division, which was itself formed in December 1940. The Walloon Legion was briefly attached to this division from December 1941 to January 1942. The Division took part in the Battle of Kharkov, the Battle of the Caucasus, and the retreat into the Kuban, where it suffered heavy losses fighting both the Red Army and partisans. The division was then involved in the battles in the Kuban bridgehead before being evacuated. The 101st was subsequently transferred to the lower Dnieper River in late 1943. It was part of the 1st Panzer Army that was surrounded in March 1944; it formed the rear guard for the XLVI Panzer Corps during the breakout of the Kamenets-Podolsky pocket. The division then retreated across Ukraine. In October 1944, it was moved to Slovakia and took part in the Battle of the Dukla Pass.

During the last year of the war, it fought in Hungary and Austria; by the end of the war, it had been reduced to the size of a Kampfgruppe.

Background
The division was raised, as the 101st Light Infantry Division, on 10 December 1940 near Prague in the German-dominated Protectorate of Bohemia and Moravia. Its home station was initially at Heilbronn and later at Karlsruhe, both in Wehrkreis V, located in the Baden-Württemberg region of Germany. Roughly one-third of the initial strength of the unit was transferred from the 35th Infantry Division, which had participated in the invasion of France and the Low Countries earlier that year, including fighting in Belgium and around Dunkirk. It had then served as part of the occupation forces on the Belgian coast.

The principal fighting units of the four light infantry divisions raised during the 12th "wave" of recruitment for the German Armyone of which was the 101st Light Infantry Divisionwere two infantry regiments of three battalions each, an artillery regiment consisting of one motorised battery of 15 cm sFH 18 heavy field howitzers and three battalions of 10.5 cm leFH 18 light howitzers, and a reconnaissance battalion consisting of a bicycle company and a horse-mounted cavalry company. What motor vehicles they were issued with had usually been captured. They were equipped as "pursuit" divisions. The division joined General der Infanterie Hans-Wolfgang Reinhard's LI Army Corps once established.

Operations
The division remained with LI Army Corps during the Axis invasion of Yugoslavia in April 1941, attacking from Austria into northern Yugoslavia as part of the 2nd Army. However, only some elements of the division were allocated to LI Army Corps on 5 Aprilthe day before the invasion beganand the rest was not transferred to LI Army Corps control until 10 April, by which time the very limited Yugoslav resistance had been completely broken. With the Yugoslavs defeated, the division was transferred to LII Army Corps, which was part of the 17th Army. After a brief period under LV Army Corps, part of the 6th Army deployed in occupied Poland, the division returned to LII Army Corps in time for the invasion of the Soviet Union in June.

The division was committed to the invasion of the Soviet Union in June 1941, as part of Army Group South. It fought in the Battle of Uman in Ukraine from mid-July to mid-August, during which Army Group South encircled and annihilated the Red Army's 6th and 12th Armies. and was transferred to Army Group South reserve in mid August. It transferred back briefly to LII Army Corps in September, before being re-allocated to LV Army Corpsnow with 17th Armylater that month. In early October, the division was briefly transferred XI Army Corps, before being transferred back to LV Army Corps and then to XVII Army Corps by early November. During this period the division fought in the Battle of Kiev and First Battle of Kharkov. In early December, the division was transferred to the reserve of the 17th Army. 

The division then fought through the winter battles of 1941–1942. In early January 1942, the division was transferred to LII Army Corps, with which it had begun Operation Barbarossa. At the end of that month, half the division was transferred to the XXXXIV Army Corps, while the remainder stayed with LII Army Corps. In late April, the remainder of the division transferred to the XXXXIV Army Corps. The division fought in the Second Battle of Kharkov in May 1942, and the capture of Rostov in July of that year. It was then committed to the Battle of the Caucasus which raged from July 1942 until the retreat into the Kuban bridgehead in early 1943. In the latter operation, the division suffered heavy losses, both from the Red Army and partisans.

The division was evacuated across the Kerch Strait and transported through Crimea to the lower Dnieper River in the latter part of 1943, where it fought at Nikolajew and Vinniza. In March 1944, the division was surrounded along with the 1st Panzer Army, and formed part of the rearguard when XXXXVI Panzer Corps conducted its successful breakout from encirclement. The division was praised for its conduct during the withdrawal across northern Ukraine, it fought in the Carpathian campaign, and was then withdrawn to the German client state of the Slovak Republic in late 1944. It was deployed south in early in 1945, buy which time two of its Jäger battalions were made up of Osttruppen recruited in the Soviet Union. The division fought rearguard actions during the withdrawal through Hungary and Austria. Reduced to kampfgruppe strength by the end of the war, it managed to surrender to US forces in the German-annexed Sudetenland.

Commanders
The following officers commanded the division: 
Generalmajor then Generalleutnant Erich Marcks (10 December 1940 - 26 June 1941)  
Generalleutnant Josef Brauner von Haydringen (26 June 1941 - 11 April 1942)  
Oberst then Generalmajor Erich Diestel (11 April 1942 - 1 September 1942)  
Oberst then Generalmajor then Generalleutnant Emil Vogel (1 September 1942 - 12 July 1944)  
Generalleutnant Dr. Walter Assmann (12 July 1944 - 8 May 1945)

Order of battle
The order of battle of the division was as follows:
228th Jäger Regiment
229th Jäger Regiment
85th Artillery Regiment
101st Reconnaissance Battalion
101th Engineer Battalion
101st Panzerjäger (Anti-tank) Battalion
101st Signals Battalion
101st Field Replacement Battalion
101st Divisional Supply Troops
101st Pack Mule Battalion

Notable members
Willi Heinrich, author of The Willing Flesh (1956), which was turned into the movie The Cross of Iron (1977), served in the division.

Footnotes

References

 

Jäger Divisions
Military units and formations established in 1941
Military units and formations disestablished in 1945